Bulatovo is a rural locality (a village) in Domshinskoye Rural Settlement, Sheksninsky District, Vologda Oblast, Russia. The population was 12 as of 2002.

Geography 
Bulatovo is located 37 km southeast of Sheksna (the district's administrative centre) by road. Pestovo is the nearest rural locality.

References 

Rural localities in Sheksninsky District